Ian Charles Ogilvy-Grant, 8th Earl of Seafield (7 October 1851 – 31 March 1884) was a Scottish nobleman. He is numbered as the 27th Chief of Clan Grant.

Genealogy
Seafield was the only child of John Charles Ogilvy-Grant, 7th Earl of Seafield and his wife the Hon. Caroline Stuart. During his minority he was entitled Viscount Reidhaven and Master of Grant. He succeeded his father as Earl of Seafield and Chief of Grant in 1881.

The main residence for Ian Charles, as for his father and mother, was Cullen House in Cullen; Castle Grant, the traditional seat of the Clan Grant, was also occupied when his Strathspey estates were visited.

As he was unmarried and had no children, by a will made in 1882 Ian Charles left his mother as the heir to his estates: Lady Caroline, the Countess Dowager, therefore was proprietor of the Seafield and Grant Estates until her death in 1911.  Meanwhile, the 8th Earl's titles of honour were inherited by his uncle, James Ogilvy-Grant, 9th Earl of Seafield who was otherwise the nearest male heir. The Seafield title was thus for some generations separated from the lands and properties that had maintained it. This situation had been made possible because the 7th Earl, John Charles, had completed the legal procedure of disentailing the estate.

Public life
Ian Charles was educated at Eton, after which on 8 December 1869 he was commissioned as a cornet and sub-lieutenant into the First Regiment of Life Guards; he was promoted lieutenant in October 1871 and retired from the army in 1877.

On succeeding to his father's seat in the House of Lords, Seafield adhered to the Conservatives. In the pamphlet published 'In Memoriam' on his death, the editors wrote: Though a constitutionalist, he was by no means a Tory of the old school. From his earliest years he took a most active part, in every political movement. He knew we live in a progressive age, and that as the nation advances in intelligence, by means of education, certain reforms become necessary, and when the proper time arrives, ought to be carried out. What he did most strenuously object to was hasty legislation, and especially legislation which might lead to the disintegration of the Empire, and to lowering of the National prestige abroad. The attempt to admit an avowed Atheist to the House of Commons was utterly repugnant to his whole nature, and no one rejoiced more than he did at the exclusion of that Atheist.The atheist in question was Charles Bradlaugh

Like his father, Ian Charles was ordained as an elder of the Church of Scotland for the Parish of Inverallan and in the Presbytery of Abernethy. He was due to attend the General Assembly of 1884 as a Commissioner for Abernethy when he died. 'In Memoriam' covered this area of his life: On many public occasions he avowed his adherence to the principle involved in a National recognition of Religion. His regard for the Church of Scotland was profound. It was evidenced by his becoming one of her active Office-bearers, and, had his life been spared, he would during the past Session of the General Assembly, have taken his seat therein, as a member of that Venerable House.

Memorials
After the death of her son, Ian Charles, Lady Seafield's priorities as Countess Dowager, besides overseeing the management of her estates, were to 'take steps for the perpetuation of (her son's) memory and that of her husband in schemes of enduring utility'. The first of these was a public hospital for Strathspey, named the Ian Charles Hospital in his memory: Thus, fifteen months after his death, in May 1885 there was opened at Grantown-on-Spey the Ian Charles Hospital. The erection and endowment of such a hospital had been arranged by the Countess Dowager and her son. It had been little more than founded when the Earl died, and his sorrowing mother brought the undertaking to a completion. All who know the capital of Strathspey know the place well.... The hospital was and is fitted with all necessary conveniences and comforts for the treatment and care of the sick, and has been of untold benefit to the Speyside district of the Seafield estates. 

The Church of Scotland parish church in Grantown-on-Spey is named 'The Seafield Memorial Church', having been erected (on the site of predecessors) at a cost of £7000 by Caroline Stuart, Countess of Seafield, in memory of both her husband John Charles and her son, Ian Charles; it opened on 1 May 1886. 

The 8th Earl of Seafield is buried at the Seafield Mausoleum at Duthil Old Parish Church and Churchyard, just outside the village of Duthil, Inverness-shire.

Note on the names Grant and Ogilvie
The family of Grant of Grant, on succeeding in 1811 to the Earldom of Seafield, first adopted the surname of 
Grant-Ogilvie, otherwise Grant-Ogilvy. This order was later reversed, so that Lord Cassillis' history, 'The Rulers of Strathspey' (1911) names the 5th, 6th, 7th and 8th Earls as Grant-Ogilvie but all their successors from Sir James, 9th Earl, as Ogilvie-Grant. Sir William Fraser's 'The Chiefs of Grant' (1884) preferred the style of Grant of Grant and Lord Ogilvie of Deskford and Cullen for both the 5th and 6th Earls; his article on the 7th Earl is named Sir John Charles Grant Ogilvie but the accompanying portrait is named Sir John Charles Ogilvie Grant, Baronet, Seventh Earl of Seafield etc. For the sake of consistency, historical works and articles (including this series) often retrospectively reassign the spelling and order of these family names.

In 2017 The family name of the Earl of Seafield is Ogilvie-Grant according to the Seafield Estates.

References

External links
 
 The Clan Grant: http://www.clangrant.org
 The Seafield Estate: http://www.seafield-estate.co.uk

1851 births
1884 deaths
People educated at Eton College
Earls of Seafield
Grant, Ian Ogilvy-Grant, 7th Lord